The Berlin Adler is an American football club based in Berlin, Germany. The club is one of the most successful clubs in the sport in Germany, having won six German Bowls as well as a ten Ladies Bowls and five Junior Bowls.

Internationally, the club has participated in the European Football League (EFL) on a number of occasions and has won the Eurobowl in 2010 and 2014.

As of 2015, the club is second only to the Munich Cowboys (405) in German Football League (GFL) games played, with 378, one of only three teams with more than 300 league games. The Cowboys have played 35 out of a possible 38 seasons at the highest level of the game in Germany, the Adler four less, 31.

History

Foundation years

The club was formed as the second American football club in Berlin on 12 February 1979, then under the name of Berliner Bären. Shortly after its formation, the club was joined by the Berlin Bats, increasing the number of club members substantially. In the early days, all training was carried out on the facilities of the US Army and supervised by US soldiers stationed in Berlin.

In 1979, the Bears became a founding member of the American Football Bundesliga, renamed the German Football League in 1999, together with the Frankfurter Löwen, Düsseldorf Panther, Ansbach Grizzlies, Munich Cowboys und Bremerhaven Seahawks.

The Bears came third in their first season in competitive football, but was unable to make the play-off in its first four seasons. To improve on-the-field performance, the team decided to join established club BSC Wilmersdorf in 1981, changing its club colors and name, becoming the Berlin Adler.

First success
The Adler began to improve in 1983, qualifying for the play-offs for the first time. A youth department was formed and the team changed mother-clubs, now joining BSC Rehberge, to gain a permanent home ground. The Adler moved into the Radrennstadion Schöneberg in 1986 as their home ground and earned their first German title the following year. After remaining unbeaten all season in 1987, the team defeated the Badener Greifs in the German Bowl, held in front of a sell-out crowd of 14,800 at Mommsenstadion in Berlin.

The team's first entry in the EFL in 1988 ended in the semi finals, losing narrowly to the Amsterdam Crusaders but, in 1989, the club returned to success, winning its second German Bowl, again undefeated all season, against the Red Barons Cologne.

Dominance
The Adler became a dominating team in Germany, achieving a 966-day unbeaten run, which only came to a halt in a league game against the Cologne Crocodiles in 1991. Before and after, the Adler defeated the Crocodiles in the German Bowl in 1990 and 1991. In European competition, the club reached the semi finals in 1990 and the final in 1991, once more losing to the Amsterdam Crusaders.

After three titles in series from 1989 to 1991, the Adler declined somewhat but remained a strong side, still reaching the semi finals in each of the following four seasons. In 1994, the club made its fifth German Bowl appearance, but lost for the first time, against the Düsseldorf Panther. In 1995, the club still had a strong season, but declined markedly after that.

Decline
The 1996 season saw the Adler in the unfamiliar position of having to combat relegation and being troubled by financial problems. It came sixth and last in its division and had to take part in the relegation round. The team assured survival there in two games against local rival Berlin Rebels. The following season proved worse however, the Adler could not win a league game all season, had to play in the relegation round once more and, after winning the first game against the Paderborn Dolphins, lost the second and were relegated to the 2nd Bundesliga.

Recovery
The club spent the next four seasons at the second level of German football, slowly rebuilding. It moved from its old ground to the Friedrich-Ludwig-Jahn-Sportpark and, in 2001, managed to win its division, entitling the team to take part in the promotion round. After playing and losing to the Kiel Baltic Hurricanes, promotion was seemingly missed, but the withdrawal of the Düsseldorf Panther from the GFL opened up a spot in the league for the Adler and the team was back at the highest level for 2002.

Berlin, in the meantime, had acquired an NFL Europe team in 1999, the Berlin Thunder, a club that lasted until 2007, when the league folded.

Return to success

The Adler once more became a successful side in the German Football League, reaching the semi finals in their first two seasons there. In 2004, the team ended the club's 13 year title drought, defeating the Braunschweig Lions in a low-scoring German Bowl.

After this, the club experienced two lean seasons, being knocked-out in the quarter finals in 2005 and having to play against relegation in 2006 but successfully avoiding the relegation round in the end.

The team did not decline further, as it had done in the 1990s, but instead reached the semi finals in 2007 and 2008. In 2007, the side lost narrowly to the Stuttgart Scorpions, in 2008 they lost to the Kiel Baltic Hurricanes, a team it was to meet in the following two German Bowls. In Europe, the Berlin Adler won the EFAF Cup, a second-tier competition, against the Parma Panthers of Italy, the club's first international title.

In 2009, the Adler had another successful season, losing only one league game and advancing to their seventh German Bowl, earning their sixth national title by defeating the Kiel Baltic Hurricanes 28–21. The 2010 season saw a repeat of this final, but this time Kiel was the stronger side and won their first national title. The Adler however achieved their second European success, finally winning the Eurobowl for the first time.

The 2011 season was not as successful for the club, making a losing appearance in the Eurobowl, finishing only fourth in the league and going out in the quarter finals of the play-offs to the Schwäbisch Hall Unicorns. In 2012, the club came second in the northern division of the GFL and qualified for the play-off where it was knocked out by the Schwäbisch Hall Unicorns in the semi finals. The team once more reached the semi finals of the play-offs in 2013, this time losing to the Dresden Monarchs.

In 2014, the club took part in a new European competition, the BIG6 European Football League, which consisted of three teams from Germany, two from Austria and one from Switzerland, the clubs being Berlin Adler, New Yorker Lions, Dresden Monarchs, Raiffeisen Vikings Vienna, Swarco Raiders Tirol and the Calanda Broncos. The two best teams of this competition advanced to the Eurobowl XXVIII. Berlin won this competition when it defeated the New Yorker Lions 20–17 in the 2014 final. In the GFL the club finished fifth in 2014 and thereby missed out on play-off qualification, repeated in 2015 when it came sixth.

Financial troubles and decline
The financial situation of the Berlin Adler began to deteriorate during this era, however, the fact that other teams failed to get a license to play in the GFL kept them from being relegated for several years, until they had to face the relegation round after the 2017 season, as fate would have it against the Potsdam Royals. As Berlin lost that game, they found themselves in GFL2 for the following season, failing to stabilize the on field situation, culminating with yet another relegation to the third tier.

Honours

Men
 Eurobowl
 Champions: 2010, 2014
 Runners-up: 1991, 2011
 EFAF Cup:
 Champions: 2008
 German Bowl
 Champions: 1987, 1989, 1990, 1991, 2004, 2009
 Runners-up: 1994, 2010
 EFL
 Participations: (10) 1988, 1990–1992, 1996, 2009–2013
 BIG6 European Football League
 Participations: 2014–present
 GFL
 Northern Division champions: (9) 1986–1992, 1994, 2009
 Play-off qualification : (25) 1983–1995, 2002–2005, 2007–2013, 2022
 League membership : (34) 1979–1997, 2002–2017, 2022–present
 GFL2
 Northern Division champions: 2001, 2021

Women
 Ladies Bowl
 Champions: (10) 1993–1997, 2000–2004
 Runners-up: 1999

Juniors
 Junior Bowl
 Champions: 1989, 1990, 1994, 1997, 2009
 Runners-up: 2006
 Junior Flag Bowl
 Champions: 2007

German Bowl appearances
The club's appearances in the German Bowl:

Recent seasons
Recent seasons of the Berlin Adler:

 LF = League Final
 RR = Relegation round.
 PR = Promotion round.
 QF = Quarter finals.
 SF = Semi finals.
 GB = German Bowl.

References

External links

  Official website
  German Football League official website
  Football History Historic American football tables from Germany

American football teams in Germany
German Football League teams
American football teams established in 1979
Sport in Berlin
1979 establishments in West Germany